The United States's Praetorian nuclear test series was a group of 19 nuclear tests conducted in 1981–1982. These tests  followed the Operation Guardian series and preceded the Operation Phalanx series.

List of the nuclear tests

References

Explosions in 1981
Explosions in 1982
1981 in military history
1982 in military history
Praetorian